Cobb Highway is a state highway in the western Riverina and the far western regions of New South Wales, with a short section in Victoria, Australia, designated part of route B75.

Initially an amalgam of stock routes, the  highway extends from the Victorian border north across central New South Wales to Wilcannia, and was named in honour of the Cobb and Co stagecoach company. The highway follows an old coach route through the Riverina, connecting the Murray, Murrumbidgee and Lachlan rivers, and across the intervening plains to the Darling River at Wilcannia. Cobb Highway also connects the Barrier, Mid-Western, Sturt, and Riverina highways.

Route

The highway travels through diverse changes in scenery, from the Murray River, enclosed farming land in the Riverina, to open grazing land and semi-desert towards the middle and northern sections. 

History
The passing of the Main Roads Act of 1924 through the Parliament of New South Wales provided for the declaration of Main Roads, roads partially funded by the State government through the Main Roads Board (later the Department of Main Roads, and eventually Transport for NSW). Main Road No. 60 was declared along this road on 8 August 1928, from the bridge over the Murray River at Moama, via Deniliquin and Hay to the intersection with Mid-Western Highway at Booligal; with the passing of the Main Roads (Amendment) Act of 1929 to provide for additional declarations of State Highways and Trunk Roads, this was amended to Trunk Road 60 on 8 April 1929. When Mid-Western Highway was re-routed to run via Hay instead of Booligal on 24 September 1929, the declaration remained unchanged.

The Department of Main Roads, which had succeeded the New South Wales MRB in 1932, declared State Highway 21 on 16 March 1938, from the state border with Victoria on the Murray River at Moama via Deniliquin to the intersection with Sturt Highway near Hay, then from the intersection with Mid-Western Highway in Hay, via Booligal to the intersection with Barrier Highway south of Wilcannia, then from Wilcannia via White Cliffs, Cobham Lake, Milparkinka and Tibooburra to the state border with Queensland at Olive Downs, subsuming Trunk Road 60. This was altered to run continuously through Hay, subsuming the small portion of Mid-Western Highway previously terminating at the intersection with Sturt Highway, on 12 January 1944; Mid-Western Highway was re-declared to terminate at the intersection with State Highway 21 in Hay as a result. With the declaration of State Highway 22 (later Silver City Highway) subsuming the alignment between Cobham Lake and the state border with Queensland on 24 January 1945, its northern end was truncated to end at the intersection with Barrier Highway south of Wilcannia; the former alignment between Wilcannia via White Cliffs to Kayrunnera was declared as Main Road 435.

State Highway 21 was named Cobb Highway on 23 April 1947, in honour of Cobb and Co, a company which ran a network of stagecoaches in inland Australia in the latter half of the 19th century and early in the 20th century.

The passing of the Roads Act of 1993 through the Parliament of New South Wales updated road classifications and the way they could be declared within New South Wales. Under this act, Cobb Highway today retains its declaration as Highway 21, from the state border with Victoria at Moama via Deniliquin, Hay, Booligal and Ivanhoe to the intersection with Barrier Highway south of Wilcannia.

Cobb Highway was signed National Route 75 across its entire length in 1955. With the conversion to the newer alphanumeric system in 2013, this was replaced with route B75.

In May 1969 a bridge over the Edward River at Deniliquin was constructed (replacing a timber bridge built in 1895). In June 1973 a bridge over Murrumbidgee River at Hay was built (replacing the 1874 opening bridge).

Cobb Highway is part of a significant travelling stock routes network in New South Wales. The highway is the focus of a major tourism initiative entitled The Long Paddock, developed by the shires along the route (Murray, Deniliquin, Conargo, Hay and Central Darling). The Long Paddock project aims to develop sustainable communities along the Cobb Highway through the development of a dynamic cultural heritage touring route. The project uses the consistent theme of transportation, involving elements of history, creative interpretation and local environment, to link the communities along the highway.

Upgrades

Echuca-Moama Bridge Project
A project to build an extra bridge over the Murray River linking Echuca and Moama commenced in late 2017 and concluded with its opening on 11 April 2022. The project had a total cost of $323.7 million, and was jointly funded by the Australian, Victorian and NSW governments.

Sealing
Work has been underway since 2011 to seal the remaining  of unsealed highway. In June 2018, the NSW Government announced it was investing $145 million to seal the remaining  of the Cobb and Silver City Highways by 2023. As of March 2020, there is still  of unsealed road remaining to be sealed.

Major intersections

See also

 Highways in Australia
 List of highways in New South Wales

References

External links

The Long Paddock: Cobb Highway Touring Route website.

Highways in Australia
Highways in New South Wales
Far West (New South Wales)